Catherine Annette Kerr Peacock (2 July 192023 September 2013), known professionally as Annette Kerr, was a Scottish born actress of film, television and stage.

Life and career
During her childhood, Kerr moved with her family from her birthplace in Scotland to Watford, Hertfordshire, where he father worked as a physiotherapist. She made her theatrical debut at the Watford Palace Theatre, and later trained at the Central School of Speech and Drama in London.

Frequent reference to Kerr is made in The Kenneth Williams Diaries (edited by Russell Davies). Kerr and Williams were close friends, and worked together in several stage productions. following their first meeting in 1949. At one point, Williams proposed to her.

Her television appearances included roles in series such as the pilot episode - "Identified" - of Anderson's live-action series UFO (1970), 2point4 Children (1991-9, as Dora Grimes) and London's Burning (1992). Her last credited TV work was One Foot in the Grave (1995, as Ruth). This marked her second appearance in the series, following a minor part as "Lady in Teashop" (1992).

She died at the actors' retirement home Denville Hall, where she had been resident, in London on 23 September 2013, aged 93.

Filmography

References

External links

Annette Kerr at Digiguide.tv

1920 births
2013 deaths
20th-century English actresses
Actresses from Hertfordshire
Alumni of the Royal Central School of Speech and Drama
English film actresses
English people of Scottish descent
English stage actresses
English television actresses
People from Renfrewshire
People from Watford
20th-century British businesspeople